Candace is a royal title from the Bible, ultimately deriving from the term kandake, a title for a queen or queen mother in the ancient African Kingdom of Kush; also meaning pure and innocent. In the United States, it was a popular name during the late 1970s, throughout the 1980s, and into the early 1990s. 

Candace  may refer to:

 Candace Allen (author) (b. 1950) (21st century), a Hollywood screenwriter
 Candace Allen (beauty queen) (21st century), a Miss District of Columbia USA 2006
 Candace Bailey (born 1982), an American actress
 Candace Cameron Bure (born 1976), an American actress
 Candace Bushnell (born 1958), an American writer
 Candace Camp (born 1949), a best-selling American writer
 Candace Charles (born 1990), a Miss Guyana 2007
 Candace Collins (born 1957), an American model and actress
 Candace Gingrich (born 1966), an LGBT rights activist
 Candace Glendenning (born 1953), an English actress
 Candace Glickman (21st century), a Miss New Hampshire 2003
 Candace Hilligoss (born 1935), an American actress
 Candace Introcaso, a President of La Roche College
 Candace Jones (born 1955), a Canadian figure skater
 Candace Kita (21st century), an American actress
 Candace Kroslak (born 1978), an American actress
 Candace Newmaker (1989–2000), a victim of child abuse
 Candace O'Connor (born 1950), a freelance writer and editor
 Candace Otto (21st century), a Miss Pennsylvania 2003
 Candace Owens (born 1989), American commentator and political activist
 Candace Parker (born 1986), an American collegiate basketball player
 Candace Pert (1946-2013), an American neuroscientist
 Candace Robb (born 1950), an English historical novelist
 Candace Savage (born 1949), a Canadian writer
 Candace Smith (b. 1977), an American actress, model and beauty queen
 Candace Talmadge (21st century), a liberal newspaper columnist
 Candace Vogler (21st century), an American philosopher
 Candace Wheeler (1827–1923), one of America's first woman interior and textile designers
 H. Candace Gorman (21st century), an American attorney

 Fictional characters
 Candace Barkham, a fictional recurring character in the Australian soap opera Neighbours
 Candace "Caddy" Compson, a fictional character from The Sound and the Fury by William Faulkner
 Candace Flynn, Phineas' older sister and Ferb's stepsister from Phineas and Ferb.
 Candace Southern, a Marvel Comics supporting character
 Candace Martin,  assistant principal
Candace Bouldin Creative Memories advisor
 Candace a playable character in Genshin Impact

See also
 Candice, a rarer variant spelling

References 

Feminine given names